Arad District is a district (bakhsh) in Gerash County, Fars Province, Iran. At the 2016 census, its population was 7,029, in 2,019 families.  The District has one city: Arad. The District has two rural district (dehestan) includes Arad Rural District and Sabzpoosh Rural District.

References 

Gerash County
Districts of Fars Province